Broughton Strait is a strait off the north coast of Vancouver Island, British Columbia, Canada, separating that island from Malcolm and Cormorant Islands, on the farther side of which is the larger Queen Charlotte Strait, which also lies beyond the western end of Brouhgton Strait, and the mouth of Knight Inlet.  Farther east from Broughton Strait is the beginning of Johnstone Strait, which leads via Discovery Passage to the Strait of Georgia.

Communities on the Broughton Strait include Port McNeill, on Vancouver Island, and Sointula and Alert Bay, on Malcolm and Cormorant Islands respectively.

During World War I

Broughton Strait was closed to shipping traffic via mines strung between Malcolm Island and Vancouver Island at McNeill point. Two small torpedo boats patrolled the waters at night.

Bibliography 
Notes

References 
 - Total pages: 596

See also
British Columbia Coast

Straits of British Columbia
Central Coast of British Columbia
Kwakwaka'wakw